Mount Pluto is a rural locality in the Whitsunday Region, Queensland, Australia.

Geography
The Proserpine River forms part of the southern boundary.

References 

Whitsunday Region
Localities in Queensland